Sennedjem was a high ancient Egyptian official living under king Tutankhamun at the end of the 18th Dynasty. Sennedjem was overseer of tutors, but also bore several other titles, such as father of the god, beloved of the god, fan-bearer on the right side of the king. Sennedjem is so far only known from his decorated tomb at Akhmim. The tomb is today heavily destroyed and much of the decoration is lost. The tomb was never finished and it is uncertain whether Sennedjem was ever buried here. In the tomb appears several times the name of king Tutankhamun, providing evidence that it was constructed under this king. In the tomb decoration also appears the overseer of nurses Senqed. The tomb was evidently built for two officials. It seems that the name of Sennedjem was deliberately erased from the tomb decoration. Evidently Sennedjem fell out of favour and his memory was deleted. It is uncertain whether that happened under Tutankhamun or later.

References 

Officials of the Eighteenth Dynasty of Egypt
14th-century BC people
Tutankhamun
Fan-bearer on the Right Side of the King